Northglenn High School is a public institution located in Northglenn, Colorado, United States.

History
Northglenn High School opened in 1965 as the first high school in the Adams 12 Five Star Schools.

From 1965-2011 Northglenn High School was the only Adams 12 school to have a swimming pool. With the introduction of STEM education (Science, Technology, Engineering and Mathematics) into Northglenn, the pool was closed and replaced with science, computer and aerospace engineering labs.

Adding STEM fields in 2011 has increased enrollment to nearly 2,000 students.

Athletics

Northglenn High School fields teams that compete in interscholastic competition as a member of CHSAA and the Eastern Metro Athletic Conference (E-MAC).

Fall sports:
 Football
 Volleyball 
 Boys' soccer
 Gymnastics
 Softball
 Cross country
 Boys' golf 
 Boys' tennis

Winter sports:
 Boys' basketball
 Girls' basketball
 Girls' swimming 
 Boys' wrestling
 Girls' wrestling

Spring sports:
 Baseball
 Track and field 
 Boys' swimming
 Girls' golf
 Girls' soccer
 Girls' tennis
 Boys' volleyball

State Championships:

 Football 4A, 1984
 Boys' soccer 4A, 1984
 Cross country 4A, 1975

Notable alumni

 Tesho Akindele, class of 2010, professional soccer forward for FC Dallas and the Canadian national team
 Jack Weil, class of 1980, former college and professional American football punter
 Tony Ramirez, Class of 1992, Former College and Professional American Football player
Laura J. Richardson, Class of 1982, Four-Star General and Commanding Officer of the United States Southern Command
Roland Stephen "Steve" Taylor, Class of 1976, Christian alternative rock musician and songwriter, also a filmmaker

See also
Adams County School District 12
List of high schools in Colorado

References

External links
 

Public high schools in Colorado
Schools in Adams County, Colorado
Educational institutions established in 1965
1965 establishments in Colorado